Pouligny-Saint-Pierre is a commune in the Indre department in central France.

The commune is known internationally for its goat's cheese, Pouligny-Saint-Pierre, that was first made in the village in the 19th century.

Geography
The commune is located in the parc naturel régional de la Brenne.

Population

See also
Communes of the Indre department

References

Communes of Indre